The Singapore Conference Hall is a multipurpose building located in the heart of the financial district of Shenton Way in Downtown Core of Singapore. The first building to be constructed along Shenton Way, it was a place for conferences and exhibitions in the 1960s and 1970s. Today, it is refurbished and modernised into a concert hall, home to the Singapore Chinese Orchestra since 2001. Completed in 1965 at a cost of S$4 million at that time, it was an example of the nation's urban architecture then. The building is situated on a three-acre site at the junction of Shenton Way and Maxwell Road.

It was gazetted as a national monument on 28 December 2010.

History
During the 1959 general election, the People’s Action Party proposed a headquarters for the trade unions as part  of its five-year plan for Singapore. A site on Armenian Street, formerly Saint Andrew's School, was initially chosen in 1960, but a larger site along Shenton Way was chosen instead in 1961. In June 1961, the government requested architects in Singapore and Malaya to submit design proposals for the building, and two local architects, Ng Keng Siang and Tio Seng Chin, were to judge them. Malayan Architects Co-Partnership's design was subsequently selected by the government in March 1962, and the designers behind the top three submissions received cash prizes.

Construction of the Singapore Conference Hall began in August 1962, with the building's foundation stone laid by a low-ranking trade unionist on 9 August. The structural parts of the building were completed by July 1964, but completion of the building, initially scheduled for end-1964, was delayed, which was attributed by a top government official to the building's "complicated nature". The Conference Hall and Trade Union House was eventually opened in October 1965, in time for the National Trade Union Congress's annual conference, and cost 

Opened on 15 October 1965 by Prime Minister, Lee Kuan Yew, the Dewan Persidangan Singapura dan Rumah Kesatuan Sekerja (Malay for Singapore Conference Hall and Trade Union House) as it was formerly known was built to house the headquarters of the National Trades Union Congress and host various exhibitions and conferences. Closely linked to Singapore’s history, the building witnessed several significant events in the post-independence years.

Architecture
The original architecture primarily consisted of concrete and glass in its facade. It has a large butterfly roof. In the past the roof and terrace were equipped with vertical sunscreens to provide shade to the interior. The concourse on the first level was conceived as a large space for programmes and from which visitors could find their way to the upper floors. Today, it is used as a concourse as well as a reception area for the Singapore Chinese Orchestra. The area can be used for exhibitions, receptions, performances and conferences. The area was originally designed as a naturally ventilated space. The trade congress rooms were located on the third to fifth floors of the building. The building was designed by Malayan Architects Co-Partnership and was completed by Architects Team 3. The five-storey building has no basement and has an outdoor car park.

References

Further reading 

National Heritage Board (2002), Singapore's 100 Historic Places, Archipelago Press, 
Wong Yunn Chii (2005), Singapore 1:1 - City, Urban Redevelopment Authority, 
Norman Edwards, Peter Keys (1996), Singapore A Guide To Buildings, Streets, Places, Times Books International,

External links

Official Website

Downtown Core (Singapore)
Concert halls in Singapore
Arts centres in Singapore
Convention centres in Singapore
National monuments of Singapore